Little Dorrit is a lost 1920 British silent historical drama film directed by Sidney Morgan and starring Lady Tree, Langhorn Burton and Joan Morgan. It is based on the 1857 Charles Dickens' novel of the same name. A few fragments totaling 18 minutes survive, and are featured in the documentary Cinema Europe: The Other Hollywood. They've also been uploaded to YouTube.

The film tells the story of Amy Dorrit, who spends her days earning money for the family and looking after her proud father, who is a long term inmate of Marshalsea debtors' prison in London. Amy and her family's world is transformed when her boss's son, Arthur Clennam, returns from overseas to solve his family's mysterious legacy and discovers that their lives are interlinked.

Cast
 Lady Tree as Mrs. Clenman  
 Langhorn Burton as Arthur Clenman 
 Joan Morgan as Amy Dorrit  
 Compton Coutts as Pancks  
 Arthur Lennard as William Dorrit  
 J. Denton-Thompson as John Chivers  
 George Foley as Merdle  
 George Bellamy as Fred Dorrit  
 Arthur Walcott as Flintwick  
 Judd Green as Old Bob 
 Betty Doyle as Fanny Dorrit  
 Mary Lyle as Mrs. Merdle

References

Bibliography
 Low, Rachael. The History of the British Film 1918-1929. George Allen & Unwin, 1971.

External links
 
 https://www.youtube.com/watch?v=LXAdxEkVo7c

1920 films
British historical drama films
British silent feature films
Films directed by Sidney Morgan
1920s historical drama films
Films based on British novels
Films based on Little Dorrit
Films set in London
Films set in the 19th century
British black-and-white films
1920 drama films
1920s English-language films
1920s British films
Silent historical drama films